Taldy-Suu may refer to the following places in Kyrgyzstan:

Taldy-Suu, Issyk Kul, a village in Tüp District, Issyk-Kul Region
Taldy-Suu, Naryn, a village in At-Bashy District, Naryn Region
Taldy-Suu, Osh, a village in Alay District, Osh Region